Moses: ein biblisches Oratorium, Op. 67 is an 1895 oratorio by Max Bruch, on a text by Ludwig Spitta for soprano, tenor, and bass. On 19 January 1895, Moses was premiered in Barmen under Bruch's direction.

References

External links
video of a performance of Moses

1895 compositions
Compositions by Max Bruch
Oratorios